The High 5s Project is an international patient safety collaboration launched by the World Health Organization (WHO) in 2006. The project addresses concerns about patient safety around the world.

The High 5s name derives from the Project's original intent to significantly reduce the frequency of 5 challenging patient safety problems in 5 countries over 5 years.

Organization
The High 5s Project was initiated by the countries Australia, Canada, Germany, the Netherlands, New Zealand, the United Kingdom, and the United States. France, Saudi Arabia, and Singapore have subsequently joined the Project. All the countries set up Lead Technical Agencies for the coordination of national project activities.
 
The project is supported by the U.S. Agency for Healthcare Research and Quality, WHO, and the Commonwealth Fund and is coordinated by the WHO Collaborating Centre for Patient Safety which is led by The Joint Commission and Joint Commission International.

Goals
 To build national and global networks.
 To achieve measurable and sustainable reductions in challenging patient safety problems.
 Implementations of standardized operating protocols.

Activities
The major components of the High 5s Project include the development and implementation of problem-specific Standardized Operating Protocols (SOPs); creation of an Impact Evaluation Strategy; a collection of data, reporting, and analysis; and the establishment of an electronic collaborative learning community.

The High 5s Project is designed to generate learning that will permit the continuous refinement and improvement of the SOPs, as well as assessment of the feasibility and success of implementing standardized approaches to specific patient safety problems across multiple countries and cultures. Achievement of the Project goals is expected to provide valuable lessons and new knowledge to support the advancement of patient safety around the world.

Five SOPs have been developed to support the Project. These SOPs address:

Assuring Medication Accuracy at Transitions in Care
Managing Concentrated Injectable Medicines
Performance of Correct Procedure at Correct Body Site
Communication failures during patient handovers
Addressing health care-associated infection.

The Impact Evaluation Strategy includes on-site observation of SOP implementation; the use of SOP-specific performance measures; use of an event analysis framework to identify occurrences that may represent SOP failures; and baseline and periodic hospital safety culture surveys.

See also
AHRQ
German Agency for Quality in Medicine
German Coalition for Patient Safety
National Patient Safety Agency

References 

Patient safety
Health care quality